Golden Arrow Bus Services (GABS) is the major public transport bus service operator for Cape Town, South Africa, providing commuter bus services throughout a large part of the City of Cape Town metropolitan area.
 
Founded in 1861, and owned by South African holding company Hosken Consolidated Investments Limited, the company operates a fleet of over 1000 buses on 1300 routes, with a daily ridership of around 220,000 people.

History

On 9 July 1861, an Act was passed that allowed for a company to be formed for the purpose of providing horse-drawn tram services between Sea Point and Cape Town. The founding company in the GABS dynasty was the Cape Town & Green Point Tramway Company, which began operating on the 1 April 1863.

Major technological innovations that shaped the fledgling industry subsequent to this were the replacement of horse-drawn trams with electric trams in 1894; the introduction of fuel powered motor buses in 1911 and trackless electric trams in 1934. During this period of innovation, mergers and acquisitions amongst competitors occurred.

In 1957, Golden Arrow Bus Services, which at the time had 85 buses and 400 employees, completed a take-over of the larger, listed Cape Tramways Limited, which had 500 buses and 2000 employees.

In 1982, the company built its Arrowgate depot in the suburb of Montana, in Cape Town. At the time it was the largest and most modern depot in Southern Africa. GABS has also designed and built depot facilities in Woodstock, Philippi, Simon’s Town and Atlantis.

In 2004, South African holding company Hosken Consolidated Investments Limited acquired Golden Arrow Bus Services.

In 2011, Golden Arrow Bus Services took ownership of its 500th bus produced by German commercial vehicle manufacturer MAN Truck & Bus AG. MAN buses account for a large portion of GABS' fleet.

In 2021 Golden Arrow announced that they had tested 3 electric busses and would put them in operation. This made Cape Town and Golden Arrow the first to implement electric busses in Africa.

Skills development

Golden Arrow Bus Services' Learning and Assessment Centre is accredited with the Transport Education and Training Authority (TETA) for all its professional driver training, and is also accredited with MerSETA. The Company utilizes a number of accredited service providers for management and leadership programs. Eligible employees are also able to access further study benefits from the company.

GABS facilitates the provision of the following accredited programs:

Professional Driver Skills Program
National Certificate in Professional Driving
Automotive Repair and Retain Commercial Learnership
Automotive Workshop Assistant
Automotive Maintenance Assistant

Corporate social responsibility

Via the donation of 50% of GABS' shares as a capital base, the Golden Arrow Foundation (GAF) was founded in 1993, as a way to give back to the communities served by Golden Arrow’s scheduled bus services.

Following the acquisition of Golden Arrow Bus Services by Hosken Consolidated Investments, the Golden Arrow Foundation was incorporated into the HCI Foundation. Since then, the Foundation has continued to provide financial support to a number of community initiatives across a wide-spectrum, including education and early childhood development, health and welfare, and social development.

Golden Arrow’s Corporate Social Investment efforts were recognised by the South African Department of Social Development and the National CSI Registrar as being a Level 3 Gold Contributor.

References

External links
Official website

Bus companies of South Africa
Companies based in Cape Town
Transport in Cape Town